HMS Redbreast was a passenger/cargo ship requisitioned by the British Government during World War I, and used as a messenger ship and anti-submarine Q-ship. She was torpedoed and sunk by the Imperial German Navy submarine  in the Aegean Sea on 15 July 1917 while on passage from Skyros to the Doro Channel. Forty-two of her crew were killed.

References

Ships built on the River Clyde
1908 ships
Q-ships of the Royal Navy
Maritime incidents in 1917
Ships sunk by German submarines in World War I
World War I shipwrecks in the Aegean Sea